Polydesmus angustus, also known as the flat-backed millipede, is a millipede in the genus Polydesmus.

References

External links
https://web.archive.org/web/20070717172021/http://www.ento.csiro.au/ecowatch/Insects_Invertebrates/diplopoda.htm

Polydesmida
Millipedes of Europe
Animals described in 1884